Barbara Gordon is a Canadian film, television and stage actress. She is most noted as a two-time Genie Award nominee for Best Supporting Actress, receiving nods at the 1st Genie Awards in 1980 for Wild Horse Hank and at the 7th Genie Awards in 1986 for Overnight.

She won a Dora Mavor Moore Award in 2000 for Best Actress, Independent Theatre, for her performance as Weasy in Factory Theatre's production of Chaz Thorne's The Dogpatch.

Filmography

Film

Television

References

External links

20th-century Canadian actresses
21st-century Canadian actresses
Canadian film actresses
Canadian television actresses
Canadian stage actresses
Dora Mavor Moore Award winners
Living people
Year of birth missing (living people)